Noémie Lvovsky (born 14 December 1964) is a French film director, screenwriter, and actress.

Life and career
Born in Paris in 1964, Lvovsky is the daughter of Jewish parents who emigrated from Ukraine to flee pogroms.
She studied cinema at La Fémis in Paris, notably a contemporary of Arnaud Desplechin, with whom she often collaborates. Her first two films cast Emmanuelle Devos, who was then at the beginning of her career.

She is the actress with most nominations for the César Award for Best Supporting Actress, with seven nominations: in 2002 for My Wife Is an Actress, in 2006 for Backstage, in 2008 for Actrices, in 2010 for The French Kissers, in 2012 for House of Pleasures, in 2016 for Summertime and in 2021 for How to Be a Good Wife. Her film Sentiments was nominated for the César Award for Best Film in 2004.

Her film Camille redouble was selected to be screened in the Directors' Fortnight section at the 2012 Cannes Film Festival where it won the Prix SACD.

She was named as one of the jury members for the Cinéfondation and short film sections of the 2014 Cannes Film Festival.

Filmography

As actress

As filmmaker

References

External links

 

1964 births
Living people
Actresses from Paris
French film actresses
French film directors
French women screenwriters
French screenwriters
Jewish women writers
French women film directors
21st-century French actresses
Jewish French actresses
Cours Florent alumni